Hamburg High School is a public secondary school in Hamburg, Erie County, New York, United States.  Hamburg High School has approximately 1,300 students in grades 9-12.  The mascot of Hamburg High School is the bulldog, and the school colors are purple and white.  Their chief athletic rivals are the cross-town Frontier Falcons, Orchard Park Quakers, and Lake Shore Eagles.

Academics

History

Former Principals 
Previous assignment and reason for departure denoted in parentheses
Byron Heath
Ford R. Park
Albert H. Downey–1909–1918 (Principal – Williamsville High School, named Principal of Waterloo High School)
Frank N. Zurbick–1918–1926
Vernon Simmons–1926–1940 (History teacher – Hamburg High School, resigned)
Leon E. Leader–1940–1946
Spencer W. Ravel–1940–1972 (unknown, retired)
Lawrence S. Hood–1972–1998 (Assistant Principal – Westhill Junior-Senior High School, retired)
Jean M. Kovach–1998–2000 (Assistant Principal – West Seneca East High School, named Director of Instruction of Hamburg Central School District)
Jacqueline K. Peffer–2000–2005 (Principal – Middleport Elementary School, named Principal of Union Pleasant Elementary School)
Michael J. Gallagher–2005–2021 (Principal – North Collins Junior/Senior High School, retired)

Notable alumni
Rosemary Barnsdall Blackmon (1939), writer and magazine editor
Colleen Brunner (1986), one of the victims of the bombing of Pan Am Flight 103; graduated from Hamburg in 1986; a scholarship for seniors is awarded annually in her memory
E. Howard Hunt (1936), author; CIA officer; member of the White House Plumbers; organizer of the Watergate burglary
Howard J. Osborn (1936), former Director of Security at the CIA
Tom Toles Pulitzer prize winning political cartoonist for The Washington Post.
George Abbott Broadway producer.
Alison Pipitone singer songwriter and guitarist.
Kathy Hochul, governor of New York.

References

External links
 http://www.hamburgschools.org

Public high schools in New York (state)
High schools in Erie County, New York